Dubrovka is a rural locality (a settlement) in Novozhiznenskoye Rural Settlement, Anninsky District, Voronezh Oblast, Russia. The population was 116 as of 2010. There are 3 streets.

Geography 
Dubrovka is located 34 km southeast of Anna (the district's administrative centre) by road. Novaya Zhizn is the nearest rural locality.

References 

Rural localities in Anninsky District